Selçuk station is a railway station in Selçuk, Turkey. The Turkish State Railways operates three regional train services from Izmir to Söke, Nazilli and Denizli, all servicing Selçuk. The station was originally built in 1862 by the Ottoman Railway Company and taken over by the state railways in 1935.

On 9 September 2017, the Southern Line of the İZBAN commuter rail system was extended from Tepeköy to Selçuk. As of September 2017, İZBAN operates 10 trains between the two stations.

Gallery

References

Railway stations in İzmir Province
Railway stations opened in 1862